SS Tiberton was a British steam cargo ship that was sunk during World War II by the German submarine U-23.

Service
Registered to owners R. Chapman & Son, Newcastle upon Tyne, Great Britain, the SS Tiberton was launched in 1920 and served in Great Britain's Merchant Navy through the 1920s and 1930s. Operating from her homeport of Newcastle, she sailed to numerous countries including Chile, Australia and Norway.

On 14 June 1928, Tiberton ran aground at Bahía Blanca, Argentina. She was refloated on 17 June 1928.

Sinking
At 04.05 hours on 19 February 1940, whilst transporting iron ore to Middlesbrough (or Immingham, Lincolnshire) Great Britain from Narvik, Norway, the unescorted Tiberton was hit by one G7e torpedo from U-23 (on her eighth sailing and active patrol in the North Sea) under the command of Otto Kretschmer. The Tiberton broke in two and sank in 30 seconds about 33 miles east of Kirkwall, Orkney. All 34 of her crew were killed.

On 10 April 1940 the SS Tiberton was officially registered with Lloyd's as Missing / Untraced and a Joint Arbitration Committee considered her a "war loss".

Memorials
The 33 British crew members are commemorated on the Tower Hill Memorial in London (Panel 108). The 34th crew member, Canadian Edward Oliver May (Third Engineer), is commemorated on the Halifax Memorial in Point Pleasant Park on the southern tip of the Halifax Peninsula, Canada. Her Majesty's Canadian Ships and visiting warships when entering or leaving Halifax Harbour and passing the Halifax Memorial between Colours (0800 hours and sunset) pipe the Still to render honours.

.

Location of Sinking
There are several estimations of the location of her sinking in the North Sea.

1.    
2.    
3.    
4. German Naval Grid Reference AN 1634

References

External links
SS Tiberton Details (and many other ship details)
SS Tiberton Photographs (and many other ship photographs)
SS Tiberton details from German perspective
SS Tiberton photos and details
Notice announcing SS Tibertons presumed sinking
UK Shipbuilding Yards
U Boat Histories
U23 Details

1920 ships
Ships built on the River Tees
Standard World War I ships
Steamships of the United Kingdom
Merchant ships of the United Kingdom
Maritime incidents in 1928
World War II merchant ships of the United Kingdom
Ships sunk by German submarines in World War II
World War II shipwrecks in the North Sea
Maritime incidents in February 1940